Movies and documentaries in which Paul Robeson has either starred, narrated or been featured and those that were film projects he was involved.

Films

Documentaries

Projects

Filmography
Male actor filmographies
American filmographies